The Volkswagen W12 was a series of concept cars created by Volkswagen Passenger Cars in 1997. The cars have been portrayed in games, such as Gran Turismo, Asphalt 8, Asphalt 9, Project Gotham Racing 3, GTI Racing, World Racing 2 and the Test Drive series. The W12 Nardò also featured in a 2013 April Fools joke as the new Volkswagen LeVanto.

Initial conception
At the request of then Volkswagen Group CEO Ferdinand Piech, Giorgetto Giugiaro and his Italdesign team was tasked to design a Volkswagen sports car, with instructions that it had to accommodate a 12-cylinder engine in a W configuration, be mid-engined, and also be able to be configured with Volkswagen's Syncro all-wheel drive system.

Another reason for its conception was to prove to the world that Volkswagen Group can build a supercar and can build a large and reliable engine for its flagship car models such as the Audi A8, Volkswagen Phaeton, and its sport utility vehicle, the Volkswagen Touareg. In fact, the W12 engine featured in the W12 Nardò concept is closely related to the engines found in the Bentley Continental GT and  Bentley Flying Spur.

The concepts

W12 Syncro (1997)
In 1997, at the Tokyo Motor Show, Volkswagen debuted their first sports car concept, a bright yellow W12 Syncro (also known as the W12 Syncro Coupé) with a 5.6-litre W12 engine producing  with Syncro four-wheel drive. This, and the W12 concepts after it, were all designed by the Italdesign firm in Italy. The W12 Syncro had the following specifications:

Front track: 
Rear track: 
Front overhang: 
Rear overhang: 
Engine position: mid longitudinal
Layout: four-wheel drive
Engine:  W12
Rated power:

W12 Roadster (1998)
It is an open topped version of W12 Syncro with red body colour, rear-wheel drive.

The vehicle was unveiled at the 1998 Geneva Auto Show. It had the following specifications:

Front track: 
Rear track: 
Front overhang: 
Rear overhang: 
Engine position: mid longitudinal
Layout: rear-wheel drive
Engine:  W12
Rated power:

W12 Nardò (2001)

In 2001, at the Tokyo Motor Show, Volkswagen Group released their most powerful W12 sports car concept yet, in bright orange (then also known as the W12 Nardò, referring to the Nardò Ring vehicle test track near the Italian city of Nardò).

Motorsport

References

External links
Italdesign pages: W12 Syncro, W12 Roadster, W12 Nardò, W12 Record
Volkswagen W12 Concept – RSportsCars.com

W12
Volkswagen W12
Rear mid-engine, rear-wheel-drive vehicles
Rear mid-engine, all-wheel-drive vehicles